The Women's 50 Breaststroke at the 10th FINA World Swimming Championships (25m) was swum 15–16 December 2010 in Dubai, United Arab Emirates. The heats and semifinals were swum 15 December; the final on 16 December.

64 swimmers swam the race. At the start of the event, the existing World (WR) and Championship records (CR) were:
WR: 28.80,  Jessica Hardy, (Berlin, Germany, 15 November 2009)
CR: 29.58,  Jessica Hardy, (Manchester 2008)

Results

Heats

Semifinals
Semifinal 1

Semifinal 2

Final

References

Breaststroke 050 metre, Women's
World Short Course Swimming Championships
2010 in women's swimming